Cédric Mabeka Lubasa (born 30 September 1983) is a Congolese footballer who currently plays as a winger for Championnat National side SO Romorantin. Lubasa was born in Kinshasa, the capital city of the Democratic Republic of the Congo and first started playing professional football for US Luzenac in France.

Club career

US Luzenac 
Lubasa kick started his professional footballing career in 2004 when he signed for Championnat de France amateur side US Luzenac. His first season was fairly unproductive, not managing to get any game time in the regular season. The 2005–06 season proved to be a little more productive acquiring 3 starts in the league and getting his first taste of cup football making an appearance in the Coupe de France. Over the next two seasons, Lubasa made a further 10 league appearances without scoring.

Etoile Sportive Fréjussienne 
At the start of the 2008–09 season, Lubasa transferred to fellow CFA side Etoile Sportive Fréjussienne. His first season at the club was rather eventful playing 26 games, scoring 6 times and seeing the merger of his team with Stade Raphaëlois. At the end of his first season the merged team was promoted to Championnat National.

Étoile Fréjus Saint-Raphaël 
After the merger between the two clubs, Lubasa saw a lot more game time playing time with Fréjus starting 37 of the 40 league games and playing twice in the Coupe de France scoring 9 times in total. Fréjus finished the season in 6th place.

Clermont Foot 
At the start of the 2010–11 season, Clermont Foot picked up Lubasa on a free transfer. In his first season for Clermont, Lubasa appeared 21 times for Clermont and a further 2 in the Coupe de France without scoring.

Statistics 
(Correct as of 30 June 2014)

References 

1983 births
Living people
Footballers from Kinshasa
Luzenac AP players
ÉFC Fréjus Saint-Raphaël players
Clermont Foot players
Gazélec Ajaccio players
SO Romorantin players
Ligue 2 players
Championnat National players
Association football midfielders
Democratic Republic of the Congo footballers
Democratic Republic of the Congo expatriate footballers
Expatriate footballers in France
21st-century Democratic Republic of the Congo people